The 2019 Colorado State Rams football team represented Colorado State University in the 2019 NCAA Division I FBS football season. The Rams were led by fifth-year head coach Mike Bobo and played their home games at Sonny Lubick Field at Canvas Stadium in Fort Collins, Colorado as members of the Mountain Division of the Mountain West Conference. The Rams finished the season 4–8, 3–5 in Mountain West play to finish in fifth place in the Mountain Division.

On December 4, head coach Mike Bobo agreed to step down as head coach. He finished at Colorado State with a five-year record of 28–35.

Previous season
The Rams finished the 2018 season 3–9, 2–6 in Mountain West play to finish in fifth place in the Mountain Division.

Preseason

Award watch lists
Listed in the order that they were released

Mountain West media days
The Mountain West media days were held from July 23−24, 2019 at Green Valley Ranch in Henderson, NV.

Media poll
The preseason poll was released at the Mountain West media days on July 23, 2019. The Rams were predicted to finish in fifth place in the MW Mountain Division.

Preseason All-Mountain West Team
The Rams had one player selected to the preseason All−Mountain West Team.

Specialists

Ryan Stonehouse – P

Schedule

Schedule Source:

Game summaries

vs. Colorado

Western Illinois

at Arkansas

Toledo

at Utah State

San Diego State

at New Mexico

at Fresno State

UNLV

Air Force

at Wyoming

Boise State

Source:

References

Colorado State
Colorado State Rams football seasons
Colorado State Rams football